Kasperi Salo (born 3 October 1979 in Kerava) is a male badminton player from Finland.

Salo played badminton at the 2004 Summer Olympics in men's singles, losing in the first round.

References
Sports Reference

External links

1979 births
Living people
People from Kerava
Finnish male badminton players
Badminton players at the 2004 Summer Olympics
Olympic badminton players of Finland
Sportspeople from Uusimaa
21st-century Finnish people